The 1934–35 Divizia A was the twenty-third season of Divizia A, the top-level football league of Romania. Venus București were the defending champions.

Teams

League table

Results

Promotion / relegation play-off

Top goalscorers

Champion squad

See also 

1934–35 Divizia B

References

Liga I seasons
Romania
1934–35 in Romanian football